The National Federation of Press Women (NFPW) is a United States-based organization of professional women and men pursuing careers in the field of communications, including electronic, broadcast and print journalism, public relations, marketing, advertising, freelancing, graphic design, digital media and photography. They are also educators and authors of all genres. Part of the coalition founding the National Women's History Museum, the NFPW supports literacy and women's rights as well as freedom of information and advocates for First Amendment issues.

History 
The National Federation of Press Women (NFPW) was organized May 6, 1937, when Helen Miller Malloch and other members of the Illinois Woman's Press Association (IWPA organized in 1885), along with women from five other organized states and the District of Columbia, who met at the Chicago Women's Club in order to promote communication between women writers, and advance the interests and standards of women in the press. One of the major concerns of these women was that copyright legislation was not being applied equally to women's creative work. Among the 39 women attending were 24 from Illinois, six from Indiana, nine from Ohio, New York, Michigan, and Washington D.C.. Incorporation of the Federation was effected in 1938 in Illinois. By 1939 nine states had affiliated, including New York, New Jersey, Indiana, Illinois, Missouri, Iowa, Texas, Oregon, and Michigan; and a New England press group. Of these new affiliates, the two oldest were Illinois (IWPA), 1885, and Texas, (the Texas Woman's Press Association) 1893 - the only two states organized prior to 1900.

Presidents (by term dates) 

 Helen Miller Malloch, (Illinois) 1937–1938
 Octavia Goodbar, ( New York ) 1938–1939
 Bertha Bliss, ( Missouri) 1940–1941
 Helen Miller Malloch, (Illinois) 1942–1943
 Gertrude Puelicher, (Wisconsin) 1943–1945
 Marie Abels, (Kansas) 1945–1947
 Catherine Dines Prosser, (Colorado) 1947–1949
 Irene R. Bedard, (Minnesota) 1949–1951
 Mattie M. Dykes, (Missouri)  1951–1953
 Helen Ankeny, (Kansas) 1953–1955
 Velma Price, (Nebraska) 1955–1957
 Mabel Temby, (Wisconsin) 1957–1959
 Helen Vanderburg, (Iowa) 1959–1961
 Roberta Martin, (Arkansas) 1961–1962
 Dr. Gertrude M. Hall, (acting) (Illinois) 1962
 Hortense P. Myers, (Indiana) 1962–1965
 Margaret Magee, (Oregon) 1965–1967
 Ulrich Troubetzkoy, (Virginia) 1967–1969
 Mildred Planthold Michie, (Missouri) 1969–1971
 Louise Shadduck, (Idaho) 1971–1973
 Naomi A. Whitesell, (Indiana) 1973–1975
 Jean Wiley Huyler, (Washington) 1975–1977
 Charlotte Tillar Schexnayder, (Arkansas) 1977–1979
 Martha S. Reed, (Texas) 1979–1981
 D. J. Cline, (South Dakota) 1981–1983
 Jo Cart, (Louisiana) 1983–1985
 Lois Jacobs, (Iowa) 1985–1987
 Mary Lou Webb, (Mississippi) 1987–1989
 Rosemary Carroll, (New Jersey) 1989–1991
 Marj Carpenter, (Kentucky) 1991–1993
 Gwen White, (North Carolina) 1993–1995
 Ruth Anna, (Colorado) 1995–1997
 Linn Rounds, (Wyoming) 1997–1999
 Vivian Sadowski, (Kansas) 1999–2001
 Ella Wright, (Alaska) 2001–2003
 Donna Penticuff, (Indiana) 2003–2005
 Meg Hunt, (South Carolina) 2005–2007
 Marsha Shuler, (Louisiana) 2007–2009
 Cynthia Price, (Virginia) 2009–2011
 Lori Potter, (Nebraska) 2011–2013
 Teri Ehresman, (Idaho) 2013–2015
 Marsha Hoffman, (Iowa) 2015–2017
 Marianne Wolf-Astrauskas, (Illinois) 2017–2019
 Gwendolynne Larson, (Kansas) 2019–present

Activity 
The NFPW conducts annual surveys about women in communications jobs.

NFPW also created its own publication, Press Woman.
AGENDA is the Federation's current publication.

Competitions

Professional Communications Contest
Each year NFPW sponsors competitions to reward excellence in communication. Winners are honored at the NFPW Professional Communications Contest Awards Banquet, which is held in conjunction with a yearly conference. The Federation's annual communications contest was established in 1940 during the presidency of Bertha I. Bless of Missouri. The presentation of honor award certificates to national winners and the announcement of the national sweepstakes winner remains a conference highlight. NFPW affiliates throughout the United States have annual communications contests that provide affiliate members an opportunity to compete against regional colleagues in a broad range of categories set by NFPW. All entrants to the national contest are required to be professional, student or retired members of NFPW. Where there is no state affiliate, the member is eligible to compete in the At-Large contest.

National High School Communications Contest
The NFPW High School Communications Contest honors excellence in student journalism and is the only nationwide communications competition for high school students. Winners at the national level are chosen by winning at the state level first. It is endorsed by the National Association of Secondary School Principals. Dow Jones announces first-place winners and promotes the competition in its publication distributed to journalism advisers across the nation, giving students and their teachers/advisers local and nationwide recognition.

Communicator of Achievement
Each year, a professional communicator is selected as the National Communicator of Achievement. This program was established during the presidency of Velma Price of Nebraska. NFPW started the program as the Woman of Achievement award which was first given at the 1957 convention in San Antonio, Texas. The first honoree was Charlotte Paul of Washington. The award was renamed Communicator of Achievement in 1989. Today, the Communicator of Achievement Award is the highest honor bestowed by the National Federation of Press Women upon those members who have distinguished themselves within and beyond their profession.

Virginia Driving Hawk Sneve, the 1975 Woman of Achievement, was an author of 20 books, numerous short stories and essays about Native American life and culture, a member of the South Dakota affiliate, and the recipient of the National Medal of Humanities. The Medal of Humanities was presented by President Bill Clinton and First Lady Hillary Rodham Clinton on Dec. 20, 2000, at D.A.R. Constitution Hall in Washington DC.

Randy Richardson, a member of the Illinois Woman's Press Association affiliate, was the 2017 Communicator of Achievement winner, becoming the first man to take the honor in 60 years.

Communicator of Achievement Honorees
The following individuals have been honored:

 1957	Charlotte Paul (Washington)
 1958	Margaret Dixon (Louisiana)
 1959	Emma C. McKinney (Oregon)
 1960	Roberta "Bobbie" Forster (Arkansas)
 1961	No Award
 1962	Agness Underwood (California)
 1963	Helen Waterhouse (Ohio)
 1964  Olive Burt (Utah)
 1965	Vada Carlson Rodridguez (Arizona)
 1966	Hortense Myers (Indiana)
 1967	Gladys Erickson (Illinois)
 1968	Mamie Boyd (Kansas)
 1969	Hilda Bryant (Washington)
 1970	Charlotte Schexnadyer (Arkansas)
 1971	Hazel Brannon Smith	(Mississippi)
 1972	Marjorie Holmes (Virginia)
 1973	Ruth Carlson (Michigan)
 1974  Emily Ivanoff Brown (Alaska) / Katharine Graham	(District of Columbia)
 1975	Virginia Sneve (South Dakota)
 1976	Lois Watkins (Virginia)
 1977	Margaret Woolfolk (Arkansas)
 1978	Kathy Piper	(Colorado)
 1979	Joann Easley Arnold (Colorado)
 1980	Lynn Stewart (Louisiana)
 1981	Faye Plank (New Mexico)
 1982	Betzi Woodman (Alaska)
 1983	Ann McKay Thompson (South Dakota)
 1984	Marj Carpenter (Georgia)
 1985	Lois Lambley (Nebraska)
 1986	Joanne Zerkel (Illinois)
 1987	Kay Kennedy (Alaska)
 1988	Jean Wiley Huyler (Washington)
 1989	Donna Hunt (Texas)
 1990  D. J. Cline (South Dakota)
 1991	Dorothy Steinmeier (Indiana)
 1992	Olga Gize Carlile	(Illinois)
 1993	Joan Burney	(Nebraska)
 1994	Mary Rueter (Iowa)
 1995	Jan Ingram	(Alaska)
 1996	Vivien Sadowski (Kansas)
 1997	Louise Seals (Virginia)
 1998	Marjorie Setter (Kansas)
 1999	No Award
 2000	Eva Marie Pearson (Arkansas)
 2001	Jane Brandt (North Dakota)
 2002	Kay Wood Bailey (Delaware)
 2003	Carole Eberly (Michigan)
 2004	Mary Kimbrough (Missouri)
 2005	Ree Strange Sheck (New Mexico)
 2006	Betty Packard (California)
 2007	Peggyann Hutchinson (Oregon)
 2008  Clara Cartrette (North Carolina) / Cary Herz  (New Mexico)
 2009	Heloise	(Texas)
 2010	Karen Stensrud (North Dakota)
 2011	Beth Miller Delaware)
 2012	Cynthia Price (Virginia)
 2013	Marianne Wolf-Astrauskas (Illinois)
 2014  Becky Funke (Kansas)
 2015  Barbara Gigone (Colorado)
 2016	Loretta Hall (New Mexico)
 2017  Randy Richardson (Illinois)
 2018  Billie Travalini (Delaware)
 2019  Eileen Wirth (Nebraska)
 2020  Sandy Michel Nance (Colorado)

References

Sources

External links 
 Official site

Women's organizations based in the United States
 
Journalism-related professional associations
Organizations established in 1937
1937 establishments in the United States
Organizations for women writers